Mark Tomlinson (born 25 March 1982) is a professional polo player who plays for the England polo team, with a handicap of seven goals in Britain and six in Argentina.

Biography
Tomlinson, whose parents Simon and Claire own the Beaufort Polo Club, was born into a family of polo players in Gloucestershire and was educated at Marlborough and the University of the West of England (UWE), Bristol with a degree in Spanish. He has an older brother and a sister, both of whom are international polo players. Emma as an amateur with a two-goal handicap and Luke Tomlinson, currently the captain in the England Team with a seven goals handicap in Britain.

Tomlinson made his first start for England in 2005.

Mark and Luke played with James Beim and Malcolm Borwick on the England team and won the Cartier International 2008 at Guards Polo Club with 10-9 against Australia. He captained and  won the St. Regis International Test Match at Cowdray Park Polo Club against Italy and the Williams De Broe Test Match at Beaufort Polo Club against New Zealand.
In the Queen's Cup 2008, he played for the Apes Hill Team and won the Vivari Cup Subfinal against team Grayshurst.

He also took part in the Argentina Polo Tour 2008, playing for the team Twelve Oaks and he was the team captain at the New Zealand Test Match, which was played in Kihikihi Polo Club on 9 February.

on 27 August 2012 he was engaged to German-born British dressage rider Laura Bechtolsheimer. The couple married in the Swiss resort of Arosa on 2 March 2013. They have three children (Annalisa, Wilfred and Hanni) and are expecting a fourth in 2021.

References

External links
Apes Hill Polo Team

English polo players
Living people
1982 births